The Declaration of 1 November 1954 is the first independentist appeal addressed by the National Liberation Front (FLN) to the Algerian people, marking the start of the Algerian Revolution and the armed action of the National Liberation Army (ALN).

Historical context

When the Movement for the Triumph of Democratic Liberties (MTLD) organized its congress in April 1953, the independence option was decided, but the date for the hasty announcement of the insurrection had not yet been set.

Writing

It was journalist Mohamed Aïchaoui who was entrusted with the task of writing the revolutionary declaration under the supervision of the two leaders Mohamed Boudiaf and Mourad Didouche of the Group of Six.

Impression
The leaflets for this proclamation were drawn in the house of activist Ali Zamoum located in the village of Ighil Imoula in Great Kabylia.

Distribution
These sheets were then put in briefcases and suitcases to be sent to their destinations in Algeria and abroad.

Presentation and analysis

This declaration aimed at Algerian national independence by:
 The restoration of the sovereign, democratic and social Algerian state within the framework of Islamic principles.
 Respect for all fundamental freedoms without distinction of races and confessions.

Indoor goals
 Political cleansing by putting the revolutionary national movement back on its true path and by destroying all the vestiges of corruption and reformism, the cause of the Algerian people regression.
 Gathering and organization of all the healthy energies of the Algerian people for the liquidation of the colonial system.

External objectives
 Internationalization of the Algerian problem.
 Achievement of North African Unity.
 Within the framework of the United Nations Charter, affirmation of the Algerian sympathy towards all nations which would support the liberating action.

Means of struggle
In accordance with revolutionary principles and taking into account internal and external situations, the continuation of the struggle by all means until the achievement of the independence goal.

To achieve these ends, the National Liberation Front will have two essential tasks to carry out simultaneously: internal action, both politically and in terms of its action, and external action in order to deal with the Algerian cause which will be a reality for the whole world with the support of all natural allies of Algerians.

This is an overwhelming task which requires the mobilization of all national energies and resources. It is true, the struggle will be long but the outcome is certain.

See also
 Algerian War
 National Liberation Front
 National Liberation Army
 Mohamed Aïchaoui
 Mohamed Boudiaf
 Mourad Didouche
 Rabah Bitat
 Abane Ramdane

External links

References

Algerian War
1954 in Algeria
November 1954 events in Africa
Declarations of independence
Documents
Political charters
Proclamations
Independence
Independence movements
Collective rights
International relations
Battles involving Algeria
Battles involving France
20th century in Algeria